Dean Lionel John Hopp (born 7 September 1982 in Heidelberg) is a South African rugby union player, who most recently played with the . His regular position is prop.

Career

He moved to Kimberley to join  in 2006. He stayed there for three seasons and made 21 appearances.

Representative rugby

He played for the victorious South African Under–21 team at the 2002 Under-21 Rugby World Cup. In 2012, he was selected in a South African Barbarians (South) team that played against England during their tour of South Africa.

References

South African rugby union players
Living people
1982 births
Eastern Province Elephants players
Griquas (rugby union) players
SWD Eagles players
Rugby union props
Rugby union players from the Western Cape